is a Japanese swimmer, who specialized in long-distance freestyle and individual medley events. She represented her nation Japan at the 2008 Summer Olympics, and has won a career total of six medals (one silver and five bronze) in a major international competition, spanning the Pan Pacific Championships and three editions of the Asian Games (2002 to 2010). Fujino was also a student at Takushoku University in Tokyo.

Fujino made her own swimming history at the 2002 Pan Pacific Swimming Championships in Yokohama, quickly claiming the bronze medal in the 400 m individual medley with a time of 4:45.79. The following year, Fujino picked up two more medals in the same stroke (silver in the 400, and bronze in the 200) at the 2003 Summer Universiade in Daegu, South Korea, posting respective marks of 2:17.41 and 4:48.44.

Five years later, Fujino competed in two swimming events at the 2008 Summer Olympics in Beijing. Leading up to the Games, she cleared FINA A-standard entry times of 8:34.17 (800 m freestyle) and 4:40.14 (400 m individual medley) at the Olympic trials in Tokyo to earn an outright selection on the Japanese team. On the first day of the Games, Fujino posted her personal best of 4:37.35 in the preliminary heats of the 400 m individual medley, but missed out the final by less than 0.21 of a second in eleventh place. In her second event, 800 m freestyle, Fujino challenged seven other swimmers on the third heat, including former Olympic champion Camelia Potec of Romania, 14-year-old Li Xuanxu of China, and top medal favorite Katie Hoff of the United States. She raced to sixth place by five seconds behind Venezuela's Andreina Pinto in 8:35.60. For the second time, Fujino failed to advance to the top 8 final, placing herself in twenty-first overall on the evening prelims.

Fujino also became the first female Japanese swimmer to dip under 4:30 barrier in the 400 m individual medley, smashing a Japanese record and her own tech suit best of 4:29.77 at the 2009 Japan Open in Tokyo.

References

External links
NBC Olympics Profile
FINA Profile

1983 births
Living people
Olympic swimmers of Japan
Swimmers at the 2008 Summer Olympics
Swimmers at the 2002 Asian Games
Swimmers at the 2006 Asian Games
Swimmers at the 2010 Asian Games
Asian Games medalists in swimming
Japanese female freestyle swimmers
Japanese female medley swimmers
Sportspeople from Tokyo
Asian Games silver medalists for Japan
Asian Games bronze medalists for Japan
Medalists at the 2002 Asian Games
Medalists at the 2006 Asian Games
Medalists at the 2010 Asian Games
Universiade medalists in swimming
Universiade silver medalists for Japan
Universiade bronze medalists for Japan
Medalists at the 2003 Summer Universiade
21st-century Japanese women